Catocala armandi is a moth of the family Erebidae. It is found in south-east Asia, including Tibet and Taiwan.

The wingspan is about 80 mm.

Subspecies
Catocala armandi armandi
Catocala armandi shirozui Sugi, 1982 (Taiwan)

References

External links
Catocala armandi shirozui image
Catocala of Asia

Moths described in 1888
armandi
Moths of Asia